Minnaar may refer to:

People
Charles Minnaar (1882-1916), South African cricketeer
Chase Minnaar (born 1986), South African rugby union player
Dawid Minnaar (born 1956), South African actor
Greg Minnaar (born 1981), South African mountain bike racer
Maxie Minnaar (died 2020), Namibian politician
Norman Minnaar (1957–2015), South African cricketer

Other uses
Minnaar's Cave, South Africa

Afrikaans-language surnames